"Peace of Mind" is a popular song, written by Lou Fields.

Teresa Brewer recording
A version recorded by Teresa Brewer in 1960 peaked at #66 on the Hot 100.

References

1960 songs